Ernst Reijseger (born 13 November 1954) is a Dutch cellist and composer. He specializes in avant-garde jazz, free jazz,  improvised music, and contemporary classical music and often gives solo concerts. He has worked with Louis Sclavis, Derek Bailey, Han Bennink, Misha Mengelberg, Gerry Hemingway, Yo-Yo Ma, Albert Mangelsdorff, Franco D'Andrea, Joëlle Léandre, Georg Gräwe, Trilok Gurtu, and Mola Sylla, and has done several world music projects working with musicians from Sardinia, Turkey, Iran, Senegal, and Argentina, as well as the Netherlands-based group Boi Akih.

He has made numerous recordings, both as solo cellist and with other groups, and has been the subject of a documentary film. He has also written several film scores, including scores for a number of Werner Herzog films.

Film scores
 2000 - Ajax: Hark the Herald Angel Sings
 2004 - The White Diamond
 2005 - The Wild Blue Yonder
 2008 - The Unforbidden City
 2009 - My Son, My Son, What Have Ye Done?
 2010 - It's Already Summer
 2010 - Cave of Forgotten Dreams
 2013 - Mongools goud – Mongolian gold
 2014 - Voor Emilia
 2015 - Prejudice
2016 - Salt and Fire
2019 - Nomad: In the Footsteps of Bruce Chatwin
 2019 - Family Romance, LLC
 2020 - Fireball: Visitors from Darker Worlds

Quotes on...
"He is a magnificent cellist, and he can do anything, anything on his cello. He could play the civil war, the American Civil War on his cello." —Werner Herzog

Solo and group work
Reijseger's most well known solo album is Colla Parte, which he recorded in a room of a small villa in which he was staying on a trip to Sardinia. This would be the same trip that he would meet the Voches De Sardinia, with whom he recorded Colla Voche.

He has done several recordings with Mola Sylla, including Requiem for a Dying Planet and Janna.

Reijseger is a member of the Amsterdam String Trio, with Ernst Glerum and Maurice Horsthuis, and another trio, simply called Graewe, Reijseger, Hemingway, with Georg Graewe and Gerry Hemingway.

He was also a member of the ICP Orchestra (or Instant Composers Pool) for many years, as well as the Clusone Trio with Michael Moore and Han Bennink.

Discography
Mistakes (Broken, 1979) with Sean Bergin
 Taiming (Hummeloord, 1981)
 Cellotape & Scotchtape (Data, 1982) with Alan "Gunga" Purves
 Dutch Masters (Soul Note, 1987) with Misha Mengelberg, Steve Lacy, George Lewis & Han Bennink
 Ta (Nimbus, 1987) with Alan "Gunga" Purves
 Sonic Fiction (Hat Art, 1989) with Georg Gräwe and Gerry Hemingway
 Noci...Strani Frutti (Leo, 1991) with Pino Minafra and Han Bennink	
 Et on ne Parle pas du Temps (FMP, 1995) with Louis Sclavis
 Colla Parte (Winter & Winter, 1997)
 Colla Voche (Winter & Winter, 1999) with Tenore and Concordu de Orosei
 I Love You So Much It Hurts (Winter & Winter, 2002) with Franco D'Andrea
 Janna (Winter & Winter, 2003) with Mola Sylla and Serigne C.M. Gueye
 Continuum (Winter & Winter, 2006) with Georg Graewe and Gerry Hemingway 
 Requiem for a Dying Planet (Winter & Winter, 2006) - soundtrack music for Werner Herzog's The White Diamond and The Wild Blue Yonder  
 Do You Still (Winter & Winter, 2007)
 Tell Me Everything (Winter & Winter, 2009)
 Zembrocal Musical (Winter & Winter, 2010) with Groove Lélé 
 My Son, My Son, What Have Ye Done (Winter & Winter, 2011)
 Cave of Forgotten Dreams (Winter & Winter, 2011) - soundtrack music for Werner Herzog's Cave of Forgotten Dreams
 Down Deep (Winter & Winter, 2013) - with Harmen Fraanje and Mola Sylla
 Feature (Winter & Winter, 2014)
 Count Till Zen (Winter & Winter, 2015) - with Harmen Fraanje and Mola Sylla  
 The Volcano Symphony (Winter & Winter, 2016)
 We Were There (Just Listen, 2020) - with Harmen Fraanje and Mola Sylla 
    
With the Amsterdam String Trio
 Winter Theme (Winter & Winter, 2000)
With the Arcado String Trio
 Green Dolphy Suite (Enja, 1995) with Trio de Clarinettes
 Live in Europe (Avant, 1996)
With the Uri Caine Ensemble
 The Goldberg Variations (Winter & Winter, 2000)
With Michael Moore
 An hour with... (Hat Hut, 2000)

References

External links
Ernst Reijseger biography
Ernst Reijseger biography
Ernst Reijseger interview

1954 births
Living people
Dutch jazz cellists
Dutch classical cellists
Dutch composers
People from Bussum
Arcado String Trio members
Clusone Trio members
Winter & Winter Records artists
Leo Records artists
Music & Arts artists
FMP/Free Music Production artists
Black Saint/Soul Note artists